Shadowfax is the second album by Shadowfax, and the band's first for Windham Hill Records. Saxophonist Chuck Greenberg was introduced to Windham Hill CEO Will Ackerman by Ackerman's cousin Alex de Grassi. The band was signed to a record deal in early 1982.

Track listing
 "Angel's Flight" – Chuck Greenberg 4:05
 "Vajra" – G.E. Stinson 4:26
 "Wheel of Dreams" – G.E. Stinson & Chuck Greenberg 4:51
 "Oriental Eyes" – Phil Maggini 4:59
 "Move the Clouds" – G.E. Stinson 3:11
 "A Thousand Teardrops" – Chuck Greenberg 4:21
 "Ariki (Hummingbird Spirit)" G. E. Stinson & Chuck Greenberg – 3:18
 "Marie" – G.E. Stinson  5:57

Personnel
G. E. Stinson – 12-string acoustic guitar, 6-string acoustic guitar, piano
Chuck Greenberg – Lyricon, soprano saxophone
Phil Maggini – bass
Stuart Nevitt – drums, percussion

Additional personnel
Emil Richards – windchimes on 1, bells on 1, contra bass marimba on 2 7, rhythm log on 2, bell tree on 2, tambourine on 2, vibes on 3, crotales on 3, kelon vibes anvil on 4, gong on 4, conga on 7, Thai vibes on 7, percussion ensemble arrangement
Alex de Grassi – 12 string acoustic guitar on the right channel on 2
Bruce Malament – Fender Rhodes on 4
Jamii Szmadzinski – violin on 5 8, baritone violin on 5 8
Scott Cossu – piano on 6

Charts

References

Shadowfax (band) albums
1982 albums
Windham Hill Records albums